Rebecca Jae Saldaña (born April 1, 1977) is an American politician serving as a member of the Washington State Senate from the 37th district, representing parts of Seattle and Renton, Washington. She was appointed by the King County Council to the office to replace Pramila Jayapal after she was elected to the United States House of Representatives.

Early life and education 
Saldaña was born in Seattle and raised in the Delridge neighborhood. Saldaña earned a Bachelor of Arts degree in theology and humanities from Seattle University.

Career 
After graduating from college, Saldaña began her career as an organizer with Oregon's farmworkers union, PCUN. She served as a Union Organizer with Service Employees International Union Local 6 in Seattle and as the community liaison for U.S. Representative Jim McDermott. At the time of her appointment, Saldaña was the executive director of Puget Sound Sage, a progressive advocacy group. Saldana gave her first speech from the Senate floor on January 16, 2017 in honor of the Martin Luther King Jr.

Saldaña currently serves on the boards of Rainier Beach Action Coalition, Alliance of Clean Jobs and Energy, The Fair Work Center, and the Washington Environmental Council. She is a former board member of the Latino Community Fund of Washington.

As of April 2021, Saldana is the vice chair of the Senate Transportation Committee. In April 2021, Saldana answered a question and was seen on video in a transportation hearing while driving her vehicle. She later apologized.

References

External links
Official Homepage
Senate Information

Living people
Politicians from Seattle
Women state legislators in Washington (state)
Democratic Party Washington (state) state senators
People from Seattle
Seattle University alumni
21st-century American politicians
21st-century American women politicians
1977 births